Andreas Andersson may refer to:

 Andreas Andersson (footballer, born 1974), Swedish footballer (forward)
 Andreas Andersson (footballer, born 1991), Swedish footballer (goalkeeper)
 Andreas Andersson (ice hockey) (born 1979), Swedish ice hockey goaltender